Longo Brothers Fruit Markets Inc., known simply as Longo's is a chain of retail supermarkets and grocery delivery service serving Southern Ontario, Canada, controlled by Sobeys parent Empire Company in partnership with the founding Longo family. Its corporate office is located in Vaughan and operates locations mainly in the Greater Toronto and Hamilton Area.

History
Longo's was founded in 1956 by Italian immigrant brothers Joe, Tommy, and Gus Longo, who immigrated to Canada in 1951 from Termini Imerese, Sicily. They established their first store at the intersection of Yonge Street and Castlefield Avenue in Toronto, with the name "Broadway Fruit Market". After the Longo family joined Antonino in Canada, they opened a store on Yonge Street in 1956. A year after the father's death in 1961, the store moved to East York.

Their second location was in Malton, at the southeast corner of Airport and Derry. While a massive gas explosion in 1969 destroyed many businesses in the community, the Longo family cleaned up and reopened after just a few days. They sold their Toronto store in 1971, to focus on their Malton operations. as increased expansion continued. In 1998, Tommy's son Anthony became the president of Longo's.

Longo's publishes a free magazine called Experience Magazine. In 2004, Longo's acquired the online grocery retailer Grocery Gateway.

Longo's owns and operates 36 stores, most in the Greater Toronto and Hamilton Area, including several smaller-format "The Market by Longo's" stores in downtown and midtown Toronto. A  flagship store opened in Maple Leaf Square in downtown Toronto. In September 2016, the chain's southwesternmost location opened in Ancaster, making it the first in Hamilton.

Longo's employs more than 5,000 people, and for nine consecutive years was one of Canada's Top 50 privately managed companies by the Financial Post newspaper (2000-2008), achieving platinum status.

Joe Longo Sr. died on September 15, 2008, at the age of 70. Tommy Longo died on January 30, 2011, at the age of 76.

On March 16, 2021, it was announced that Empire Company, parent company of Sobeys, will buy a 51% stake in Longo's and its Grocery Gateway e-commerce business (which was acquired by Longo's in 2004) for $357 million. The deal, which closed in May 2021, includes a clause allowing Sobeys' share to increase in future years. The Longo's stores and Grocery Gateway "will continue to be led by CEO Anthony Longo". The plan was subject to review by the Competition Bureau.

In September 2021, the Grocery Gateway delivery service was folded under the Longo's banner, with the transitional name "Longo's delivered by Grocery Gateway". The Longo's delivery operation continues as a standalone business, but may collaborate with Sobeys' own Voilà delivery brand.

Locations

36 locations:
Ajax
Ancaster
Aurora
Brampton (2)
Burlington (2)
East Gwillimbury
Guelph
Maple (2)
Markham (2)
Milton
Mississauga (4)
Oakville (3)
Richmond Hill
Stouffville
Thornhill
Toronto (10, including 5 "The Market by Longo's" locations)
Woodbridge (2)

See also
List of supermarket chains in Canada

References

External links

1956 establishments in Ontario
Companies based in Vaughan
Retail companies established in 1956
Supermarkets of Canada
Privately held companies of Canada
Canadian companies established in 1956